The Mačva District is one of eight administrative districts of Šumadija and Western Serbia. It expands in the western parts of Serbia, in the geographical regions of Mačva, Podrinje, Posavina, and Pocerina. According to the 2011 census results, it has a population of 298,931 inhabitants. The administrative center of the Mačva district is the city of Šabac.

Cities and municipalities
The district encompasses the cities of Šabac and Loznica and municipalities of:
 Bogatić
 Vladimirci
 Koceljeva
 Mali Zvornik
 Krupanj
 Ljubovija

Demographics

According to the last official census done in 2011, the Маčva District has 298,931 inhabitants. 29.14% of the population live in the urban areas.

Ethnic groups
Ethnic composition of the Mačva district:

History and culture

Famous monuments can be seen in the vicinity of Šabac, dedicated to events from the history of Serbian people: the Monument to Karađorđe and Serbian Heroes of the First Serbian Uprising and the Museum of the Battle of Mišar, the remnants of the ancient cities on the banks of the Sava river: Novo Selo, the site of the King Milutin's Palace and Kosanin grad, the medieval fortress on the Cer Mountain.

Not far away from Loznica stands the village of Tršić, the birthplace of the reformer of Serbian language and orthography, Vuk Karadžić. From Tršić, a footpath leads to the Tronoša Monastery, one of the oldest medieval endowments of the Nemanjić dynasty. This fourteenth-century monastery played an important part in the preservation of Serbian culture and tradition. Over a long period, particularly during the fourteenth century, a copying school tradition was nourished in it for its own and other monasteries' needs. This preserved the historic and cultural documents of the Serbian people.

See also
 Administrative divisions of Serbia
 Districts of Serbia

References

Note: ''All official material made by Government of Serbia is public by law.

External links

 

 
Districts of Šumadija and Western Serbia